Gjuvkampen is a mountain in Skjåk Municipality in Innlandet county, Norway. The mountain is surrounded by several other notable mountains including Tverrfjellet to the south, Grjothøi to the southwest, and Lomseggi to the southeast.

See also
List of mountains of Norway

References

Skjåk
Mountains of Innlandet